Aleptina junctimacula is a moth in the family Noctuidae (the owlet moths). It was described by André Blanchard in 1984 and is found in North America.

The MONA or Hodges number for Aleptina junctimacula is 9071.1.

References

 Lafontaine, J. Donald & Schmidt, B. Christian (2010). "Annotated check list of the Noctuoidea (Insecta, Lepidoptera) of North America north of Mexico". ZooKeys, vol. 40, 1–239.

Further reading

External links

 Butterflies and Moths of North America

Amphipyrinae
Moths described in 1984